The 1899–1900 United States collegiate men's ice hockey season was the 6th season of collegiate ice hockey. 

Princeton University played several games during the season, however, Princeton's records for its ice hockey team begin with the 1900–01 season.

Regular season

Standings

References

1899–1900 NCAA Standings

External links
College Hockey Historical Archives

 
College